Tacopaya Municipality is the second municipal section of the Arque Province in the Cochabamba Department in Bolivia. Its seat is Tacopaya. At the time of census 2001 the municipality had 11,658 inhabitants.

Geography 
Some of the highest mountains of the municipality are listed below:

Cantons 
The municipality is divided into two cantons. They are (their seats in parentheses):
 Tacopaya Canton - (Tacopaya)
 Ventilla Canton - (Ventilla)

Languages 
The languages spoken in the Tacopaya Municipality are mainly Quechua and Spanish.

References 

Municipalities of the Cochabamba Department